Cryptophilus is a genus of pleasing fungus beetles in the family Erotylidae. There are about nine described species in Cryptophilus.

Identification 
Cryptophilus adults are brown and slightly hairy beetles, 1.6-2.3 mm long and with 3-segmented antennal clubs. They resemble beetles of the unrelated family Cryptophagidae. Unlike cryptophagids, Cryptophilus have procoxal sockets that are closed.

The larvae are long, hairy and have a granulate or tuberculate dorsum. They can be mistaken for larvae of Monotoma (Monotomidae) or Epuraea (Nitidulidae), which occur in similar habitats. Cryptophilus larvae can be recognised by their mandibles, which lack a sub-apical accessory tooth and have a large, subtriangular prostheca.

Ecology 
Cryptophilus occur in decaying plant matter (e.g. leaf litter, wood debris, compost heaps, grass cuttings, straw) and also in stored food products (e.g. cereals, beans, flour, dried fruit, nuts). Adults and larvae are mycophages that feed on mould.

Species
These nine species belong to the genus Cryptophilus:
 Cryptophilus cryptophagoides Grouvelle, 1916
 Cryptophilus fluminalis Casey, 1924
 Cryptophilus integer (Heer, 1841)
 Cryptophilus minimus Grouvelle, 1913
 Cryptophilus mirus Grouvelle, 1913
 Cryptophilus obliteratus Reitter, 1878
 Cryptophilus propinguus Reitter, 1874
 Cryptophilus propinquus Reitter, 1874
 Cryptophilus seriatus Casey, 1924

References

Further reading

External links

 

Erotylidae
Articles created by Qbugbot